La Peña is a municipality and town of Colombia in the department of Cundinamarca. La Peña is located in the west of Cundinamarca, in Gualivá Province,  from Bogotá.

Municipalities of Cundinamarca Department